Yap white-eye can refer to either of the two species of white-eye found on Yap.

 Yap olive white-eye (Zosterops oleagineus)
 Plain white-eye (Zosterops hypolais)